The 2002–03 Georgia Tech Yellow Jackets men's basketball team represented the Georgia Institute of Technology in the 2002–03 season. Led by head coach Paul Hewitt and freshman forward Chris Bosh, the Jackets finished the regular season with a 14–13 record, before losing to North Carolina State in the 2003 ACC tournament. Bosh averaged 15.6 points and 9 rebounds per game. After accepting an invitation to the 2003 National Invitation Tournament, the Jackets made their way to the quarterfinals, where they fell to Texas Tech. Following the season, Bosh was selected as the fourth overall pick in the 2003 NBA Draft, which also included future teammates Dwyane Wade and LeBron James.

Roster 
 Chris Bosh
 Robert Brooks
 B. J. Elder
 David Ewing
 Jarrett Jack
 Marvin Lewis
 Anthony McHenry
 Isma'Il Muhammad
 David Nelson
 Ed Nelson
 Jim Nyström
 Luke Schenscher
 Theodis Tarver
Sources:

References

Georgia Tech Yellow Jackets men's basketball seasons
Georgia Tech
Georgia Tech
Georgia Tech Yellow Jackets
Georgia Tech Yellow Jackets